Sue Ellicott is a former television correspondent for the BBC and political writer for The Times in Washington, DC. Ellicott has appeared on CNN, ABC News, and Politically Incorrect. Ellicott is one of the recurring guest panelists on the NPR radio news quiz show Wait Wait... Don't Tell Me! She was briefly a co-host of Air America Radio's Morning Sedition with comedian Marc Maron and radio veteran Mark Riley. She also appeared on Last Call with Elvis Mitchell, Stuttering John Melendez and Tad Low, a late-night gabfest on CBS affiliates in the early 1990s.

External links

British journalists
Living people
Year of birth missing (living people)